James Andrew Crowell IV (born December 24, 1973) is an associate judge of the Superior Court of the District of Columbia. In January 2019, Crowell was nominated by President Donald Trump to a 15-year term as an associate judge on the Superior Court of the District of Columbia. He was confirmed by the U.S. Senate on August 1, 2019. His official investiture ceremony took place on January 31, 2020.

Crowell received his Bachelor of Arts from Hampden–Sydney College and his Juris Doctor from the Boston University School of Law. After law school, he clerked for Charles A. Pannell Jr. of the United States District Court for the Northern District of Georgia.

Prior to becoming a judge, Crowell served as a federal prosecutor for 16 years, where he prosecuted cases involving national security, fraud, corruption, violent crime, and narcotics. Immediately prior to his nomination as a judge, he was director of the Executive Office for United States Attorneys. Prior to serving as director, Crowell served in the Office of the Deputy Attorney General as principal associate deputy attorney general, chief of staff, and associate deputy attorney general. Crowell has served in the United States Army Reserve since 1994.

References

External links
 

1974 births
Living people
21st-century American judges
21st-century American lawyers
Assistant United States Attorneys
Boston University School of Law alumni
Hampden–Sydney College alumni
Judges of the Superior Court of the District of Columbia
People from Metairie, Louisiana
United States Army reservists
United States Department of Justice lawyers